Friedrich Ludwig Benda (baptized 4 September 1746 in Gotha – 20 or 27 March 1792 in Königsberg) was a German violinist and composer.

Benda was the eldest son of Georg Anton Benda. He was appointed concert director at Königsberg in 1789.

Selected works
 Der Barbier von Sevilla, Singspiel in 4 acts (1776–1779); libretto by Friedrich Wilhelm Großmann after Beaumarchais
 Die Verlobung, Singspiel (1790); libretto by Friedrich Ernst Jester
 Louise, Singspiel in 3 acts (1791); libretto by Friedrich Ernst Jester
 Mariechen, Singspiel in 3 acts (1791–1792); libretto by Friedrich Ernst Jester
 Der Herr ist König, Psalm 97, Cantata

References

External links
 

1746 births
1792 deaths
German classical composers
German male classical composers
German classical violinists
Male classical violinists
German violinists
German male violinists
18th-century classical composers
18th-century German composers
18th-century German male musicians